The 2014 Hong Kong Super Series will be the twelfth super series tournament of the 2014 BWF Super Series. The tournament will be contested in Hong Kong from November 18–23, 2014 with a total purse of $350,000. A qualification will occur to fill four places in all five disciplines of the main draws.

Men's singles

Seeds 

  Chen Long
  Jan Ø. Jørgensen
  Tommy Sugiarto
  Kenichi Tago
  Wang Zhengming
  Son Wan-ho
  Chou Tien-chen
  Tian Houwei

Top half

Bottom half

Finals

Women's singles

Seeds 

  Wang Shixian
  Wang Yihan
  Saina Nehwal
  Ratchanok Intanon
  Carolina Marín
  Tai Tzu-ying
  Pusarla Venkata Sindhu
  Minatsu Mitani

Top half

Bottom half

Finals

Men's doubles

Seeds 

  Lee Yong-dae / Yoo Yeon-seong
  Muhammad Ahsan / Hendra Setiawan
  Hiroyuki Endo / Kenichi Hayakawa
  Lee Sheng-mu / Tsai Chia-hsin
  Ko Sung-hyun / Shin Baek-cheol
  Liu Xiaolong / Qiu Zihan
  Chai Biao / Hong Wei
  Marcus Fernaldi Gideon / Markis Kido

Top half

Bottom half

Finals

Women's doubles

Seeds 

  Misaki Matsutomo / Ayaka Takahashi
  Tian Qing / Zhao Yunlei
  Reika Kakiiwa / Miyuki Maeda
  Luo Ying / Luo Yu
  Bao Yixin / Wang Xiaoli
  Tang Jinhua / Tang Yuanting
  Nitya Krishinda Maheswari / Greysia Polii
  Eefje Muskens / Selena Piek

Top half

Bottom half

Finals

Mixed doubles

Seeds 

  Zhang Nan / Zhao Yunlei
  Xu Chen / Ma Jin
  Chris Adcock / Gabrielle Adcock
  Ko Sung-hyun / Kim Ha-na
  Lu Kai / Huang Yaqiong
  Liu Cheng / Bao Yixin
  Michael Fuchs / Birgit Michels
  Sudket Prapakamol / Saralee Thoungthongkam

Top half

Bottom half

Finals

References 

Hong Kong Super Series
Hong Kong Super Series
Hong Kong Super Series
Hong Kong Open (badminton)